Peg-Leg Pedro is a 1938 Technicolor cartoon sponsored film. A boy and girl on a trip are attacked by pirates while looking for treasure. It features the character Nicky Nome. The cartoon is actually an advertisement for Chevrolet. It is a spin-off of A Coach for Cinderella & A Ride for Cinderella. The film is in the public domain.

See also
A Coach for Cinderella
A Ride for Cinderella
The Princess and the Pauper
Chevrolet
Jam Handy
Advertising
Sponsored film

External links
IMDB
Jim Handy films archived at Bibi.org
Free legal download of Peg-Leg Pedro

References

Sponsored films
Jam Handy Organization films
1938 animated films
1938 films
Chevrolet
Promotional films